Frances Wood is an English historian.

Frances Wood may also refer to:
Frances Wood (statistician) (1883–1919), English statistician
Frances Fisher Wood, American educator, lecturer, and scientist
Frances Shimer, Frances Ann Wood, founder of the Mount Carroll Seminary

See also
Francis Wood (disambiguation)
Frank Wood (disambiguation)